The House at 4 Birch Avenue in Methuen, Massachusetts is a Bungalow-style house built c. 1910.  Its style, uncommon in the area, is reminiscent of period architecture in California.  It is a two-story wood-frame structure with a porch that is faced in fieldstone, and has oversized turned balusters between square fieldstone pillars.  On the right side, the porch has a rounded corner that is topped by a conical roof section.

The house was listed on the National Register of Historic Places in 1984.

See also
 National Register of Historic Places listings in Methuen, Massachusetts
 National Register of Historic Places listings in Essex County, Massachusetts

References

Houses completed in 1910
Houses in Methuen, Massachusetts
National Register of Historic Places in Methuen, Massachusetts
Houses on the National Register of Historic Places in Essex County, Massachusetts